A Thousand Splendid Suns is a 2007 novel by Afghan-American author Khaled Hosseini, following the huge success of his bestselling 2003 debut The Kite Runner. Mariam, an illegitimate teenager from Herat, is forced to marry a shoemaker from Kabul after a family tragedy. Laila, born a generation later, lives a relatively privileged life, but her life intersects with Mariam's when a similar tragedy forces her to accept a marriage proposal from Mariam's husband.

Hosseini has remarked that he regards the novel as a "mother-daughter story" in contrast to The Kite Runner, which he considers a "father-son story". It continues some of the themes used in his previous work, such as familial dynamics, but instead focusing primarily on female characters and their roles in contemporary Afghan society.

A Thousand Splendid Suns was released on May 22, 2007, and received favorable widespread critical acclaim  from Kirkus Reviews, Publishers Weekly, Library Journal, and Booklist, and became a number one New York Times Best Seller for fifteen weeks following its release. During its first week on sale, it sold over one million copies. Columbia Pictures purchased film rights in 2007, and a theatrical adaptation of the book premiered on February 1, 2017, at the American Conservatory Theater in San Francisco, California.

Creation

Title
The title of the book comes from a line in Josephine Davis' translation of the poem "Kabul", by the 17th-century Iranian poet Saib Tabrizi:
"Every street of Kabul is enthralling to the eye
Through the bazaars, caravans of Egypt pass 
One could not count the moons that shimmer on her roofs 
And the thousand splendid suns that hide behind her walls"

Hosseini explained "I was searching for English translations of poems about Kabul, for use in a scene where a character bemoans leaving his beloved city, when I found this particular verse. I realized that I had found not only the right line for the scene, but also an evocative title in the phrase 'a thousand splendid suns,' which appears in the next-to-last stanza."

Inspiration
When asked what led him to write a novel centered on two Afghan women, Hosseini responded:"I had been entertaining the idea of writing a story of Afghan women for some time after I'd finished writing The Kite Runner. That first novel was a male-dominated story. All the major characters, except perhaps for Amir's wife Soraya, were men. There was a whole facet of Afghan society which I hadn't touched on in The Kite Runner, an entire landscape that I felt was fertile with story ideas...In the spring of 2003, I went to Kabul, and I recall seeing these burqa-clad women sitting at street corners, with four, five, six children, begging for change. I remember watching them walking in pairs up the street, trailed by their children in ragged clothes, and wondering how life had brought them to that point...I spoke to many of those women in Kabul. Their life stories were truly heartbreaking...When I began writing A Thousand Splendid Suns, I found myself thinking about those resilient women over and over. Though no one woman that I met in Kabul inspired either Laila or Mariam, their voices, faces, and their incredible stories of survival were always with me, and a good part of my inspiration for this novel came from their collective spirit."

Writing

Hosseini disclosed that in some ways, A Thousand Splendid Suns was more difficult to write than his first novel, The Kite Runner. He noted the anticipation for his second book when writing it, compared to The Kite Runner wherein "no one was waiting for it." He also found his second novel to be more "ambitious" than the first due to its larger cast of characters; its dual focus on Mariam and Laila; and its covering a multi-generational-period of nearly forty-five-years in total. However, he found the novel easier to write once he had begun, noting "as I began to write, as the story picked up the pace and I found myself immersed in the world of Mariam and Laila, these apprehensions vanished on their own. The developing story captured me and enabled me to tune out the background noise and get on with the business of inhabiting the world I was creating." The characters "took on a life of their own" at this point and "became very real for [him]".

Similar to The Kite Runner, the manuscript had to be extensively revised; with Hosseini ultimately rewriting the book five times before it was complete. The novel's anticipated release was first announced in October 2006, when it was described as a story about "family, friendship, faith and the salvation to be found in love".

Plot

On the outskirts of Herat, Mariam lives with her embittered mother, Nana, in a secluded hut. Born as a result of an extra-marital liaison between her mother and Jalil, a wealthy local businessman, the family lives outside of the city in order to avoid confronting Jalil's three wives and nine legitimate children. Nana resents Jalil for his mistreatment of her and his deceptive attitude towards Mariam, whom he visits every Thursday. On her fifteenth birthday, Mariam asks her father to take her to see Pinocchio at a cinema he owns and to introduce her to her siblings. Jalil promises to do so but when he does not come to pick her up, Mariam travels to Herat herself, against the wishes of her mother. Mariam makes her way to her father's home, where she is not allowed in and is informed he is away on a business trip; after spending the night on the street, Mariam is able to storm the house's garden and sees that Jalil is home. Upon returning to her home, Mariam finds her mother has hanged herself. Mariam temporarily stays with Jalil, but is quickly married off to Rasheed, a widowed shoemaker from Kabul thirty years her senior, and moves with him to Kabul. Rasheed is initially kind to Mariam, but after she becomes pregnant and miscarries multiple times, their relationship sours and he becomes increasingly abusive to her over her inability to bear him a son.

Meanwhile, Mariam's young neighbor Laila grows up close to her father, Hakim, an educated school teacher, but worries about her mother, Fariba, who experiences poor mental health following the death of her two sons fighting for the Mujahideen against the Soviets. Laila is close to Tariq, a local Pashtun boy with one leg, and as they grow older a romance develops between them. When Afghanistan enters civil war and Kabul is bombarded by rocket attacks, Tariq's family decide to leave the city, and Laila and Tariq have sex prior to his departure. Shortly afterwards, Laila's family decide to also leave the city, but before they can, a rocket hits their home, killing Hakim and Fariba and injuring Laila who is then taken in by Mariam and Rasheed. 

As Laila recovers from her injuries, Rasheed expresses a romantic interest in her, much to Mariam's dismay. Laila is also informed that Tariq and his family died in a bomb blast on their way to Pakistan. Upon discovering she is pregnant with Tariq's child, Laila agrees to marry Rasheed to protect herself and her baby, whom Rasheed believes to be his. When she gives birth to a daughter, Aziza, Rasheed rejects them due to her being a girl. Mariam, initially cold and hostile towards Laila, warms to her as they both suffer abuse. They become confidants and formulate a plan to run away from Rasheed and leave Kabul; however, they are caught and severely punished by Rasheed.

The Taliban rise to power in Kabul and impose harsh rules on the local population, severely curtailing women's rights. Laila is forced to give birth to a son, Zalmai, via a Caesarian section without anaesthesia due to the women's hospital being stripped of its supplies. Laila and Mariam struggle with raising Zalmai, whom Rasheed dotes on and favours over Aziza, causing difficulties in managing Zalmai's behaviour. During a drought, Rasheed's workshop burns down, and he is forced to take other jobs. Due to a lack of food, Rasheed sends Aziza to an orphanage. Laila endures a number of beatings from Taliban when caught travelling alone to attempt to visit Aziza when Rasheed refuses to accompany her as her guardian.

Tariq appears at the family home and reunites with Laila, who learns Rasheed hired a man to falsely claim that Tariq had been killed so that she would agree to marry him. When Rasheed returns home from work, Zalmai informs Rasheed that Laila had a male visitor. Suspicious of Laila and Tariq's relationship and suspecting he is Aziza's real father, Rasheed beats Laila and attempts to strangle her; Mariam strikes Rasheed with a shovel, killing him. She tells Laila and Tariq to leave with Aziza and Zalmai, and confesses to the Taliban to killing Rasheed, for which she is publicly executed.

Laila and Tariq leave Afghanistan and move to Murree, Pakistan, where they get married. After the fall of the Taliban, they decide to return to Kabul to be present for the rebuilding of Afghan society. They stop en route to Herat, where Laila visits the village where Mariam was raised. She meets with the son of a kindly mullah who taught Mariam, who gives her a box Jalil had entrusted to the family to care for and give to Mariam should she return to Herat. The box contains a videotape of Pinocchio, a small sack of money, and a letter, in which Jalil expresses regrets at sending Mariam away, wishing he had fought for her and raised her as his legitimate child. The family return to Kabul and use the money to repair the orphanage Aziza had stayed in, and Laila works there as a teacher. She becomes pregnant with her third child, whom she will name Mariam if it is a girl.

Characters
 Mariam, an ethnic Tajik born in Herat in 1959. The illegitimate child of Jalil and Nana, his housekeeper, she suffered shame throughout her life due to the circumstances of her birth, and is forced to marry a much older shoemaker and move to Kabul after her mother's death. Hosseini described Mariam as "isolated in every sense of the word. She is a woman who is detached from the day-to-day norms of human existence. Really, she just wants a connection with another human being". Despite initially resenting Laila, she becomes a "friend and a doting alternative mother" to her through the "common hardship" of being married to the "abusive, psychologically imposing" Rasheed. Mariam kills Rasheed while defending Laila, for which she is publicly executed by the Taliban.
Laila, an ethnic Tajik born in Kabul in 1978. The only surviving child of Hakim and Fariba after her older brothers die in the Afghan-Soviet War, she is raised by educated parents who educate her, first at school and later at home when Kabul becomes too dangerous. Compared to Mariam, Hosseini noted she "had a much more fulfilling relationship with her father, her [girlfriends] and her childhood friend, Tariq. She expected to finish school and is looking for personal fulfillment. These are two very different representations of women". Laila's life becomes tied with Mariam's when she is forced to marry Rasheed in order to protect herself and her unborn child after the death of her parents and supposed death of Tariq. This initially causes resentment from Mariam, who "[feels] her territory infringed upon". Despite this, "Laila becomes her daughter for all practical purposes" on account of the struggles and abuse they both experience during their marriage. At the end of the novel, Laila returns to Kabul becomes a schoolteacher at an orphanage.
Rasheed, an ethnic Pashtun from Kabul who works as a shoemaker. Prior to his marriages to Mariam and Laila, he had a son who drowned; it is suggested in the novel that this happened as a result of Rasheed being drunk while caring for him. Rasheed is an aloof father to his 'daughter' Aziza but is notably much more loving towards his son Zalmai. After suffering years of experiencing domestic abuse, Mariam bludgeons Rasheed to death with a shovel while he attempts to strangle Laila to death. Hosseini hoped to make a multi-layered character with Rasheed, noting "Rasheed's the embodiment of the patriarchal, tribal character. In writing him, I didn't want to write him as an irredeemable villain. He is a reprehensible person, but there are moments of humanity, such as his love for his son." Hosseini identified an encounter with an Afghan man who "had a very sweet, subservient wife" and had not yet informed her that he was planning to marry again" as an inspiration for the character.
Tariq, an ethnic Pashtun born in Kabul in 1976 who grew up with Laila. He lost a leg to a landmine at the age of five. They evolve from friends to lovers shortly before he flees Kabul with his family; after a decade of separation, during which time he lives as a refugee in Afghanistan and loses his parents while Laila was led to believe he had died, Tariq and Laila reunite in Kabul. After Rasheed's death they leave for Pakistan and marry, before returning to Kabul, expecting their third child at the end of the novel.
Nana, an ethnic Tajik from a village outside Herat who previously worked as a servant for Jalil. Mariam is born as a result of an affair between the two, and Jalil's favouritism towards his wives and legitimate children leaves her bitter towards Jalil. Nana often reports having the jinn inside her; it is hinted in the book that she in reality experiences from mental health difficulties for which she refuses to be medicated. After Mariam leaves the family home for the first time on her own to find Jalil on her fifteenth birthday, Nana hangs herself after Mariam refuses to stay with her. 
Mullah Faizullah, a local Sufi imam who teaches Mariam the Qur'an and supports her and Nana. He dies of natural causes in 1989.
Jalil, a local businessman in Herat who has three wives and nine (later ten) legitimate children in addition to Mariam. While doting on her, his ultimate reluctance to treat her like his legitimate children leads to her breaking off their relationship. Before his death, he expresses regret for his treatment of Mariam through a letter that would have been given to her if she had ever returned to Herat by Mullah Faizullah, instead, it is given to Laila when she goes to visit Mariams home village.
Hakim, Laila's father, a university educated man from Panjshir who works first as a teacher and then at a factory after the war. He is progressive and wishes for Laila to be educated and make her own decisions in life. He is killed in a rocket explosion alongside his wife Fariba while preparing to flee Kabul.
Fariba, Laila's mother, originally from Panjshir. She briefly meets Mariam when she first arrives in Kabul, and is depicted as a cheerful woman. Her disposition is permanently changed after her two sons, Ahmad and Noor, are killed in the Afghan-Soviet War. She spends her time mourning in bed until the Mujahideen are victorious over the Soviets. She is later killed in a rocket explosion alongside her husband Hakim as they prepare to flee the city.
Aziza, the illegitimate daughter of Laila and Tariq, born in 1993 in Kabul. When Laila learns of Tariq's alleged death, she marries Rasheed in order to hide Aziza's illegitimacy. Aziza's birth marks Laila's fall from favour with Rasheed and leads to the friendship between Mariam and Laila. During a famine, Aziza temporary is placed into an orphanage so she can be fed.
Zalmai, the legitimate son of Laila and Rasheed, born in 1997 in Kabul. Laila initially considers aborting him due to him being Rasheed's biological child. Zalmai idolises his father despite his abuse of Laila and Mariam. Zalmai remains unaware that Mariam killed Rasheed and is led to believe he has left Kabul. Zalmai does not respect Tariq, but by the end of the novel appears to be accepting him as a father figure.

Analysis

Family
When asked about common themes in The Kite Runner and A Thousand Splendid Suns, Hosseini replied:"Both novels are multigenerational, and so the relationship between parent and child, with all of its manifest complexities and contradictions, is a prominent theme. I did not intend this, but I am keenly interested, it appears, in the way parents and children love, disappoint, and in the end honor each other. In one way, the two novels are corollaries: The Kite Runner was a father-son story, and A Thousand Splendid Suns can be seen as a mother-daughter story."

He considers both novels to be "love stories" in the sense love  "draws characters out of their isolation, that gives them the strength to transcend their own limitations, to expose their vulnerabilities, and to perform devastating acts of self-sacrifice".

Women in Afghanistan
Hosseini visited Afghanistan in 2003, and "heard so many stories about what happened to women, the tragedies that they had endured, the difficulties, the gender-based violence that they had suffered, the discrimination, the being barred from active life during the Taliban, having their movement restricted, being banned essentially from practicing their legal, social rights, political rights". This motivated him to write a novel centered on two Afghan women.

The Washington Post critic Jonathan Yardley suggested that "the central theme of A Thousand Splendid Suns is the place of women in Afghan society", pointing to a passage in which Mariam's mother states, "learn this now and learn it well, my daughter: like a compass needle that points north, a man's accusing finger always finds a woman. Always. You remember that, Mariam."

In the book, both Mariam and Laila are forced into accepting marriage to Rasheed, who requires them to wear a burqa long before it is implemented by law under the Taliban. He later becomes increasingly abusive. A Riverhead Trades Weekly review states that the novel consistently shows the "patriarchal despotism where women are agonizingly dependent on fathers, husbands and especially sons, the bearing of male children being their sole path to social status."

Reception
In the first week following its release, A Thousand Splendid Suns sold over one million copies, becoming a number-one New York Times bestseller for fifteen weeks. Time magazine's Lev Grossman placed it at number three in the Top 10 Fiction Books of 2007, and praised it as a "dense, rich, pressure-packed guide to enduring the unendurable." Jonathan Yardley said in the Washington Post "Book World", "Just in case you're wondering whether Khaled Hosseini's A Thousand Splendid Suns is as good as The Kite Runner, here's the answer: No. It's better."

A Thousand Splendid Suns received significant praise from reviewers, with Publishers Weekly calling it "a powerful, harrowing depiction of Afghanistan" and USA Today describing the prose as "achingly beautiful". Lisa See of The New York Times attributed the book's success to Hosseini "[understanding] the power of emotion as few other popular writers do". Natasha Walter from The Guardian wrote, "Hosseini is skilled at telling a certain kind of story, in which events that may seem unbearable - violence, misery and abuse - are made readable. He doesn't gloss over the horrors his characters live through, but something about his direct, explanatory style and the sense that you are moving towards a redemptive ending makes the whole narrative, for all its tragedies, slip down rather easily."

Cathleen Medwick gave the novel a highly positive review in O, the Oprah Magazine:"Love may not be the first thing that comes to mind when you consider the war-ravaged landscape of Afghanistan. But that is the emotion—subterranean, powerful, beautiful, illicit, and infinitely patient—that suffuses the pages of Khaled Hosseini's A Thousand Splendid Suns. As in his best-selling first novel, The Kite Runner, Hosseini movingly examines the connections between unlikely friends, the fissures that open up between parents and children, the intransigence of quiet hearts."

The New York Times writer Michiko Kakutani wrote a more critical review, describing the opening as "heavy-handed" and early events in the novel as "soap-opera-ish". Despite these objections, she concluded, "Gradually, however, Mr. Hosseini's instinctive storytelling skills take over, mowing down the reader's objections through sheer momentum and will. He succeeds in making the emotional reality of Mariam and Laila's lives tangible to us, and by conjuring their day-to-day routines, he is able to give us a sense of what daily life was like in Kabul — both before and during the harsh reign of the Taliban." Similarly, Yvonne Zipp of The Christian Science Monitor concluded that A Thousand Splendid Suns was ultimately "a little shaky as a work of literature".

The depictions of the lead female characters, Mariam and Laila, were praised by several commentators. John Freeman from The Houston Chronicle found them "enormously winning" while Carol Memmott from USA Today further described them as "stunningly heroic characters whose spirits somehow grasp the dimmest rays of hope". Medwick summed up the portrayals: "Mariam, branded as a harami, or bastard, and forced into an abusive marriage at the age of fifteen, and Laila, a beauty groomed for success but shrouded almost beyond recognition by repressive sharia law and the husband she and Mariam share. The story, epic in scope and spanning three decades, follows these two indomitable women whose fortunes mirror those of their beloved and battered country—'nothing pretty to look at, but still standing'—and who find in each other the strength they need to survive."

Jennifer Reese from Entertainment Weekly dubbed Rasheed "one of the most repulsive males in recent literature". Lisa See wrote that, with the exception of Tariq, "the male characters seem either unrelentingly evil or pathetically weak" and opined, "If a woman wrote these things about her male characters, she would probably be labeled a man-hater."

On November 5, 2019, the BBC News listed A Thousand Splendid Suns on its list of the 100 most inspiring novels.

Adaptations
Columbia Pictures owns the movie rights to the novel. Steven Zaillian finished writing the first draft of the screenplay in 2009 and was also slated to direct; Scott Rudin had signed on as a producer. In May 2013, studios confirmed a tentative release date of 2015, although as of 2022 the film remains unproduced.

The first theatrical adaptation of the novel premiered in San Francisco, California, on February 1, 2017. It is co-produced by the American Conservatory Theater and Theatre Calgary. The theatrical adaptation condenses the novel for length, beginning with the deaths of Hakim and Fariba and telling earlier sections (such as Mariam's childhood and Laila and Tariq's romance) through flashbacks.

A television limited series adaptation of the novel is in works by One Community.

An opera adaptation of the novel, composed by Sheila Silver, was commissioned by Seattle Opera and premiered on February 25, 2023.

References

External links
 Khaled Hosseini's official website
 A Study Guide

2007 American novels
Afghan literature
American novels adapted into plays
Novels set in Afghanistan
Novels by Khaled Hosseini
Novels set in Pakistan
Refugees and displaced people in fiction
Riverhead Books books
2007 Afghan novels